Lars Penke (born 2 September 1978) is a professor of biological personality psychology at the Georg August University of Göttingen in Germany. He is also an associate member of the Centre for Cognitive Ageing and Cognitive Epidemiology at the University of Edinburgh in the United Kingdom. His research focuses on evolutionary and personality psychology, including the evolutionary importance of psychological traits such as human intelligence. He is a member of the International Society for Intelligence Research and the Human Behavior and Evolution Society.

References

External links

Faculty page
Profile at Social Psychology Network

Living people
1978 births
Academic staff of the University of Göttingen
Humboldt University of Berlin alumni
German psychologists
Evolutionary psychologists